The Little Cut, also known as the Rain Hall Rock Branch or the Rain Hall Rock Canal, was a short canal connecting the Leeds and Liverpool Canal at Barnoldswick to the nearby Rain Hall Rock limestone quarry. The canal ran north-east for  through farmland and a deep cutting—including two tunnels—before terminating in a small basin.

Canal 

The cut was constructed in 1796, around the time of the second phase of the Leeds and Liverpool Canal. The short length of the canal led to it being named locally as the "Little Cut", although it was formally known as the Rain Hall Rock Canal or Rain Hall Rock Branch.

A  tunnel was bored through the limestone near Higher Barnsay Farm, before a northwards bend took the canal through a deep cutting; this was the start of the quarry and the original canal terminus,  from its junction with the main line. This tunnel was the only tunnel on the Leeds and Liverpool Canal to carry the towpath as well as the waterway. From the canal's junction with the main line, the towpath ran along the south side of the channel. Upon reaching the second tunnel, a turnover bridge moved the towpath to the north side of the canal.

Permission to extend the quarry was granted in 1826 and the canal was extended through a second tunnel. A further extension had been made by 1862, when a viaduct was built (as an accommodation bridge) across the cut. Rather than building a large wharf or dock, limestone was loaded directly from the quarry into waiting barges in a widened basin.

The quarry closed around the end of the First World War, and later the cut was used by Lancashire County Council for landfill. Only the central cutting—between the two tunnels—as well as parts of the tunnels are extant.

Quarry
Rock from the quarry has been classified by the British Geological Survey as nodular micaceous sandy limestone, with some specimens containing forams.

References 

1796 establishments in England
Canals in Lancashire
Canals opened in 1796
Conservation areas in England
Sites of Special Scientific Interest in Lancashire
Transport in Liverpool